Cerithiella axicostulata is a species of very small sea snail, a marine gastropod mollusk in the family Newtoniellidae. It was described by Castellanos, Rolán and Bartolotta, in 1987.

Description 
The maximum recorded shell length is 4.7 mm.

Habitat 
Minimum recorded depth is 600 m. Maximum recorded depth is 600 m.

References

Newtoniellidae
Gastropods described in 1987